Surya Majapahit (Kawi: ꦯꦸꦂꦪꦩꦗꦥꦲꦶꦠ꧀, Sanskrit: मजपहितस्य सूर्य) (Surya of the Majapahit) is the emblem commonly found in ruins dated from the Majapahit era. The emblem commonly took the form of an eight-pointed sun ray with the rounded part in the center depicting Hindu deities. The emblem might have taken the form of a cosmological diagram haloed by typical sun rays, or a simple circle with typical sun rays. Because of the popularity of the Surya emblem during the Majapahit era, it has been suggested that may have served as the imperial symbol of the Majapahit empire.

Hindu deities
The most common depiction of Surya Majapahit consists of the images of nine deities and eight sun rays.
The round center of the sun depicting nine Hindu Gods called Dewata Nawa Sanga. The major gods in the center is arranged in eight cardinal points around Shiva in the center. The arrangements are:
Center: Shiva
East: Isvara
West: Mahadeva
North: Vishnu
South: Brahma
Northeast: Sambhu
Northwest: Sangkara/shankara
Southeast: Mahesora
Southwest: Rudra

Eight other deities are located at the outer rim of the sun, symbolized by eight shining sun rays:
East: Indra
West: Varuna
North: Kubera
South: Yama
Northeast: Isana
Northwest: Vayu
Southeast: Agni
Southwest: Nirṛti

The emblem is rendered in many forms; sometimes it took the form of the circle of deities and sun rays, or just a simple eight-pointed sun ray such as the emblematic Surya Majapahit set into the ceiling of Candi Penataran. The deities in the sun arranged as cosmological diagram in the form of a mandala. Another variation of Surya Majapahit is the eight pointed sun rays with the god of sun Surya in the center riding celestial horse or chariot.
The carving of Surya Majapahit usually can be found on the center ceiling of the Garbhagriha (inner sanctum) of the temple such as Bangkal, Sawentar, and Jawi temple. Surya Majapahit also can be found on the Stella, carving of halo or aura at the back of the statue's head. The carving of Surya Majapahit also commonly found in gravestone dating from Majapahit era, such as the Troloyo cemetery in Trowulan.

See also

 Star of Lakshmi — a star-shaped symbol that represents Lakshmi, the Hindu goddess of wealth
 Flags and emblems of Majapahit

References

General
 Exhibit of "Kejayaan Kerajaan-kerajaan Kuno Indonesia" (The Glory of Ancient Indonesian Kingdoms) at Istana Anak-anak Indonesia, Taman Mini Indonesia Indah, displayed Majapahit artifacts the collection of Trowulan Museum, East Java. April 2009.

Majapahit
Hindu symbols
Hindu iconography
Coats of arms
Infographics
Diagrams
Hindu deities
Hindu philosophical concepts
Religious symbols